PrankStars (stylized as Prank★Stars) is a 2011 American six-episode reality television series that aired monthly and employed the use of a hidden camera. The series premiered on Disney Channel on July 15, 2011, and was hosted by Pair of Kings and Hannah Montana star, Mitchel Musso. The television program portrayed scenarios in which children and teenagers met their favorite stars in "unpredictable and humorous" settings that had been engineered by their friends and family. The show was Disney Channel's first reality series since the Totally in Tune show. In Canada, Family Channel aired two episodes of PrankStars on September 30, 2011, and a total of four episodes were originally supposed to broadcast before the series was withdrawn. The fourth episode aired a day before Musso's mid-October 2011 arrest on a charge of driving while intoxicated (and subsequent removal from the cast of Pair of Kings), and the remaining two episodes premiered solely in Europe and Latin America.

Stars

Episodes

See also
 Punk'd
 Code: 9
 Walk the Prank

References

External links
 
 

2010s American comedy television series
2010s American reality television series
2011 American television series debuts
2011 American television series endings
Disney Channel original programming
English-language television shows
American hidden camera television series
Television series by Disney